The Hochschule Harz – University of Applied Studies and Research has two bases in Saxony-Anhalt. The Department of Automation and Computer Sciences as well as the Department of Business Studies are located in Wernigerode. The Department of Public Management can be found in Halberstadt.

History 

In October 1991, Hochschule Harz was founded as “Fachhochschule Harz”. Initially, the courses on offer consisted of Business Administration, Tourism, and Business Informatics at the Department of Business Studies in Wernigerode. 77 students took up their studies in the 1991/1992 winter term. Meanwhile, six Bachelor's degree programs are offered at the Department of Business Studies. Today the number of students has increased to about 1,700.  In the 2007/2008 winter term, two Master's degree programs – „Business Consulting“ and „Tourism and Destination Development“ – were launched.

In autumn 1992 – one year after the foundation of the University of Applied Sciences – teaching started at the Department of Automation and Computer Sciences. At the beginning of the 1992/1993 winter term, 28 students were enrolled in the degree programs “Electrical Engineering” and “Computer Science” for the first time. Today, about 800 students are enrolled in a total of eight computer science and engineering-based degree programs. The course offer was completed with the Master's degree program “Computer Science/Mobile Systems”.

The Department of Public Management in Halberstadt is the youngest department, and at the same time the second base of Hochschule Harz. In the 1998/1999 winter term, with the implementation of the degree programs “Public Administration” and “Administrative Economics/Public Service Management”, university education for the public sector started. The course offer was enlarged by introducing the degree programs “European Administrative Management” and “Administrative Management/eGovernment”. Undergraduate degree programs of the Department of Public Management are currently complemented by the Master's degree program “Public Management”.

“Fachhochschule Harz” was renamed “Hochschule Harz – University of Applied Sciences” on January 27, 1998. The courses on offer increased continuously in the following years. In 2003, Hochschule Harz received the award „best practice Hochschule 2003" from „Centrum für Hochschulentwicklung“ (CHE).

Campus Wernigerode 

Wernigerode is the headquarters of Hochschule Harz. The administrative and didactic buildings of the Department of Business Studies as well as the Department of Automation and Computer Sciences are located on a 62,000 sqm large, green campus in Hasserode (district of Wernigerode). In a new building on the site of a former paper mill, central departments like an electronic data processing center, a library, numerous didactic rooms/laboratories, and a media center with integrated recording studio can be found. The Language Self-Learning Center aims to improve language skills of students individually by integrating multimedia systems. The main auditorium contains more than 250 seats and high-tech equipment.

Since the 2006 summer term, a Student Service Center takes care of students’ needs. Moreover, Hochschule Harz is equipped with WiFi internet access, bundled service facilities (dining hall, cafeteria, halls of residence), and offers a large selection of sports facilities, a broad cultural program and a variety of student associations. A beach volleyball court, an open air chess installation, fitness rooms, and a modern sports hall are also situated on the campus in Wernigerode.

Campus Halberstadt 

In the 2004/2005 winter term, the Department of Public Management started teaching at the new campus of Hochschule Harz: Domplatz Halberstadt. In the city center of Halberstadt old and new architecture is fused together and forms three buildings. The large lecture hall designed along the lines of the British Commons has room for lectures and public events. In addition to regular language courses, a Language Self-Learning Center is available to students at Halberstadt, too. The dining hall “Domcafete” of the Student Union Magdeburg was recently established.

International alignment 
By converting the course offer into internationally recognized Bachelor's degree programs and introducing Master's degree programs, the Bologna Process is taken into account by Hochschule Harz. Due to the comparability of final examinations, the creation of a European education system enables increased individual mobility within the course of studies and an international career after completing university.

The international profile of Hochschule Harz is reflected by intense language courses in all degree programs, international course offers, and the application of the European Credit Transfer System (ECTS) in all Departments. Currently, the International Office is responsible for 71 cooperations with foreign partner universities in 28 countries worldwide. Each term, more than 100 students from Hochschule Harz benefit from the opportunity to study abroad for one or more terms (outgoing). Concurrently, approx. the same number of multinational students is welcomed as full-time or exchange students at Hochschule Harz (incoming).

Research 
Hochschule Harz is the location of the Centre of Competence for “Information and Communication Technologies, Tourism and Services” that is part of the research initiative “Network of Excellence for Applied and Transfer-oriented Research” (KAT) in Saxony-Anhalt. Within this network, applied research activities of all institutions of higher education in Saxony-Anhalt are linked to each other: All in all, 157 projects of four universities of applied sciences with a total capacity of about eight million Euros in 2009. Since 2005, the following research foci of the Centre of Competence of Hochschule Harz have been defined:

 e-government for business organizations
 legal basis of e-administration
 application of geographic information systems and web-mapping-services
 polymer fibers
 tourism for generation 50 plus
 security, distribution and e-government
 automated vehicular disposition
 microcontroller applications

The thematic spectrum of research projects of Hochschule Harz ranges from communication technology, mobile robotics, and electronic administration to service quality in tourist value-added chain and double-entry bookkeeping. The volume of third-party funding regularly makes up ten percent of the budget of Hochschule Harz.

Arts, culture, and lecture series at Hochschule Harz 
Hochschule Harz has a deep relationship with the Harz region. Many offers are explicitly addressed to non-students. The exchange of ideas between different generations and occupational groups represents the main concern of this alignment.

Art exhibitions 
The Rector’s Office, a 100-year old villa with a varied history, and the so-called paper mill, a new building on Wernigerode’s campus, incorporate areas for various art exhibitions that are held on a regular basis. A wide range of student, full-time, and amateur artists from the region or other areas are targeted.

„Foundation Karl Oppermann“ 

Exceptional for a university of applied sciences in Saxony-Anhalt, the “Foundation Karl Oppermann” was opened at Hochschule Harz in 2008. The internationally known artist and former professor at University of Arts in Berlin contributed four large-format oil paintings that deal with international issues. These masterpieces are a donation or on permanent loan to the library of Hochschule Harz in Wernigerode and accessible to the public. In 2009, the artist enlarged the foundation with a portrait of Alexander von Humboldt and a large-format triptych. Oppermann’s paintings are about self-awareness, departure, and search for luck, but also about escape, expulsion, and fight for survival.

Conference and Event Management 
In 2006, increasing interest in using Hochschule Harz as a seminar and congress location resulted in founding a department for Conference and Event Management with a market-driven service offer.

GenerationenHochschule – Education that encompasses all generations 

Since 2007, the so-called GenerationenHochschule (Generations’ University) has evolved into something of a tradition, which is embraced by the local communities. Twelve times a year more than 250 students representing all generations participate in special lectures given by certified experts of Hochschule Harz or the world of business. The headlines of these lectures stem from world of business, nature, and environment; they are related to present and future ways of life. In 2009, the program of the GenerationenHochschule was complemented by the series "GenerationenHochschule aktuell". These special lectures are dedicated to the latest and spontaneous topics.

KinderHochschule – Children’s University 

In partnership with the Internationale Bund (International Foundation) and supported by sponsors from the world of business the so-called KinderHochschule (Children’s University) has been taking place four times a year, on Saturdays, since 2006. All presentations are designed specifically for children – they are hands-on and interactive. In the early days of 2009 GEOlino, a science journal for children also started supporting the project.

In addition to a certificate, which is handed out at every event, the young students bring home a junior student pass, and collect points until they reach “the status of genius”. Every step in their career ladder is rewarded with some little present.

External links 

 Website Hochschule Harz
 Website GenerationenHochschule
 Website KinderHochschule
 Website Media Informatics, Hochschule Harz

Universities and colleges in Saxony-Anhalt
Universities of Applied Sciences in Germany
Wernigerode
Halberstadt